The Country Club, located in Brookline, Massachusetts, is the oldest golf-oriented country club in the United States. (The Philadelphia Cricket Club, founded in 1854, was the first country club for any sport.) It holds an important place in golf history, as it is one of the five charter clubs that founded the United States Golf Association, and has hosted numerous USGA tournaments including the 1913 U.S. Open won by then-unknown Francis Ouimet.  Although the club has 1300 members, it is known for its exclusivity.

History
On January 14, 1882, a group of men from Boston met to form the club. The club is listed on the USGA's list of the first 100 clubs in America.  The original club was focused on horseback-riding and other outdoor activities; the golf course was not built until 1893.  For several years there were conflicts between golfers and other club members over land use; in fact the original golf course overlapped with the pre-existing race track.

The golf course itself grew in several stages, and so is not the result of any one architect.  The first six holes were laid out by three club members in March 1893, and the following year the Scot, Willie Campbell, was brought in as club professional.  He oversaw the expansion to nine holes that summer, and to a full 18 holes by 1899 following some land acquisition.  Around 1902 the Haskell golf ball became widely used, necessitating a further lengthening of the course.  After an additional land purchase, two club members designed three new holes which opened in 1908.  Rees Jones renovated the course further in preparation for the 1988 U.S. Open.

In 1894 The Country Club was one of the five charter clubs which founded the United States Golf Association.  The original purpose was to sponsor an undisputed national amateur championship, which was first held in 1895.  The first U.S. Open (almost an afterthought) was held the following day.  The first USGA championship held at the club was the 1902 U.S. Women's Amateur.

In 1896 the Club hired Scottish professional Alex Campbell, who would go on to serve as the head professional from 1896 to 1916. Campbell was in large part responsible for the development of caddie Francis Ouimet into a championship caliber player.

The 1913 U.S. Open was held at The Country Club.  The heavy favorites were English legends Harry Vardon (1900 U.S. Open winner; four-time British Open winner) and Ted Ray (reigning British Open champion).  After 72 holes the pair found themselves tied with 20-year-old amateur Francis Ouimet — who had grown up across the street from the course and was a former caddy at the club — forcing an 18-hole playoff the next day.  In a shocking upset, Ouimet soundly defeated the two professional golfers in front of a large gallery, and the resulting newspaper stories captured the imagination of the American public.  The number of golfers in the country at least tripled in the subsequent ten years, with a corresponding increase in golf courses (including many public courses, opening up the game to a larger segment of the population).  The 1963 and 1988 U.S. Opens were also held at The Country Club, the 50th and 75th anniversaries of the Ouimet victory. However, the 2013 U.S. Open, marking the 100th anniversary of Ouimet's improbable win, was contested at Merion Golf Club near Philadelphia. The Country Club instead hosted the 2013 U.S. Amateur.

The story of Francis Ouimet's triumph at the 1913 US Open was commercialized by Mark Frost’s 2002 book, The Greatest Game Ever Played: Harry Vardon, Francis Ouimet, and the Birth of Modern Golf, which Frost then adapted for a 2005 film.

No Jews were admitted as members until the 1970s. The Country Club opened full membership to women for the first time in 1989. No African-Americans were admitted as members until 1994; Governor Deval Patrick complained he and his wife were "blackballed" from the club.

The club hosted the Ryder Cup in 1999.  This intense match exploded into controversy following a competition-turning 45-foot putt on the 17th green by Justin Leonard (the same green where Ouimet effectively clinched his victory), as the other American players stormed the green in celebration before José María Olazábal had a chance to attempt his own difficult putt.  Olazábal was forced to regain his focus after order was restored, and missed the putt.

The Country Club has long been considered the best course in Massachusetts and has hosted a record 10 Massachusetts State Amateur Championships.

Golf courses
The golf facilities have a total of 27 holes, divided between two courses.

The Main Course is composed of the Clyde and Squirrel nines, essentially the original 18 holes.  This was the course used for the 1913 U.S. Open, and is the course played by members today.

The other nine holes are the Primrose Course, an executive course built in 1927.  This was designed by William S. Flynn, who also (re)designed Shinnecock Hills, Cherry Hills Country Club near Denver, and the Cascades Course at The Homestead, and the Kittansett Club also in Massachusetts.

The Championship, Composite, Anniversary, or Open Course is used for major competitions today, when a longer layout is required. In this configuration, three and a half holes from the Primrose Course are used to replace three holes of the Clyde. Specifically, one hole from the Main Course is replaced by a composite hole that uses the teeing ground of the 1st Primrose hole and the putting surface of the 2nd Primrose hole, while two other Main holes are replaced in their entirety by the 8th and 9th Primrose holes. Today, this results in a length of over 7,300 yards. This layout was first used in the 1957 U.S. Amateur, but its routing significantly changed for the 1963 U.S. Open. The 1963 routing was used for all major events at the club through the 2013 U.S. Amateur. The Championship Course was altered again for the 2022 U.S. Open, with the par-4 4th hole of the Main Course removed and the par-3 12th hole of the Main Course added, resulting in a 7,312-yard par-70 layout.

Tournaments

Major championships

Other tournaments 
1905 Massachusetts Amateur, won by Arthur G. Lockwood
1908 Massachusetts Open, won by Alec Ross
1911 Massachusetts Open, won by Donald Ross
1915 Massachusetts Open, won by Walter Hagen
1920 Massachusetts Amateur, won by Fred Wright
1925 Massachusetts Amateur, won by Francis Ouimet
1932 Walker Cup, won by the United States over Great Britain & Ireland 9-2
1934 Massachusetts Amateur, won by William O. Blaney
1949 Massachusetts Amateur, won by Bobby Knowles
1953 U.S. Girls' Junior Amateur Championship, won by Mildred Meyerson
1967 Massachusetts Amateur, won by Barrie Bruce
1968 U.S. Junior Amateur Championship, won by Eddie Pearce
1973 Walker Cup, won by the United States over Great Britain & Ireland 14-10
1976 Massachusetts Amateur, won by Bruce Douglass
1987 Massachusetts Amateur, won by Kevin Jones
2003 Massachusetts Amateur, won by Andy Drohen
2009 Massachusetts Amateur, won by Bill Drohen

Notable members
 Tom Brady and Gisele Bündchen - Professional athlete and fashion model, respectively
Anne Nason - Golfer
Prescott F. Hall - Lawyer and eugenics advocate

Other facilities

In addition, the club has five indoor tennis courts, four outdoor tennis courts including grass courts, paddle & squash courts, an Olympic-sized swimming pool with a cafe, curling, skeet shooting, skating & hockey rink.

References

External links
Official site
1913 US Open at club from the Library of Congress at Flickr
Founding of The Country Club
Francis Ouimet's U.S. Open win

1882 establishments in Massachusetts
Buildings and structures in Brookline, Massachusetts
Curling clubs in the United States
Curling in Massachusetts
Golf clubs and courses in Massachusetts
Ryder Cup venues
Sports in Brookline, Massachusetts
Sports venues completed in 1882
Walker Cup venues